Hines is a city in Harney County, Oregon, United States. The population was 1,563 at the 2010 census.

History
A community named Herrick was formed just southwest of Burns when railroad promoter and sawmill operator Fred Herrick founded a lumber company there. Edward Hines bought the railroad and lumber company from Herrick in 1928, and a post office named Hines was established in 1931 to serve the Edward Hines Lumber Company mill and surrounding community. The mill has since changed hands at least two more times. The mill closed in 2006.

Geography

Demographics

2010 census
As of the census of 2010, there were 1,563 people, 678 households, and 423 families living in the city. The racial makeup of the city was 94.9% White, 0.3% African American, 1.0% Native American, 0.4% Asian, 1.2% from other races, and 2.4% from two or more races. Hispanic or Latino of any race were 3.1% of the population.

There were 678 households, of which 28.8% had children under the age of 18 living with them, 49.7% were married couples living together, 9.9% had a female householder with no husband present, 2.8% had a male householder with no wife present, and 37.6% were non-families. 32.0% of all households were made up of individuals, and 17.9% had someone living alone who was 65 years of age or older. The average household size was 2.25 and the average family size was 2.83.

The median age in the city was 42.5 years. 24.1% of residents were under the age of 18; 6% were between the ages of 18 and 24; 21.8% were from 25 to 44; 28.2% were from 45 to 64; and 19.8% were 65 years of age or older. The gender makeup of the city was 49.6% male and 50.4% female.

2000 census
As of the census of 2000, there were 1,623 people, 641 households, and 473 families living in the city. The population density was 684.8 people per square mile (264.4/km). There were 689 housing units at an average density of 290.7 per square mile (112.2/km). The racial makeup of the city was 94.39% White, 0.12% African American, 2.71% Native American, 0.55% Asian, 0.06% Pacific Islander, 0.12% from other races, and 2.03% from two or more races. Hispanic or Latino of any race were 1.66% of the population.

There were 641 households, out of which 31.8% had children under the age of 18 living with them, 63.5% were married couples living together, 6.4% had a female householder with no husband present, and 26.2% were non-families. 21.8% of all households were made up of individuals, and 8.7% had someone living alone who was 65 years of age or older. The average household size was 2.50 and the average family size was 2.89.

In the city, the population was dispersal was 26.6% under the age of 18, 6.3% from 18 to 24, 27.0% from 25 to 44, 26.1% from 45 to 64, and 14.0% who were 65 years of age or older. The median age was 40 years. For every 100 females, there were 106.5 males. For every 100 females age 18 and over, there were 98.7 males.

The median income for a household in the city was $40,917, and the median income for a family was $43,452. Males had a median income of $32,772 versus $22,458 for females. The per capita income for the city was $15,783. About 6.6% of families and 9.9% of the population were below the poverty line, including 10.1% of those under age 18 and 17.3% of those age 65 or over.

Transportation
Haney County Senior & Community Services Center operates the Dial-A-Ride, which provides a local bus route between Burns and Hines.

Education
Hines is in Harney County School District 3. Its comprehensive high school is Burns High School.

Harney County is not in a community college district but has a "contract out of district" (COD) with Treasure Valley Community College. TVCC operates the Burns Outreach Center in Burns.

References

External links

 City of Hines Profile from Harney County Economic Development
 Company Towns in The Oregon Encyclopedia
 Hines in the Oregon Blue Book
 Hines and the Edward Hines Lumber Company in The Oregon Encyclopedia

Cities in Oregon
Company towns in Oregon
Cities in Harney County, Oregon
Populated places established in 1930
1931 establishments in Oregon